HD 73526 c is an extrasolar planet orbiting about 97 million miles (1.05 AU) away from its parent star. Based on its mass, this planet is likely to be a gas giant. At the distance this planet orbits from its star, which is more luminous than the Sun, HD 73526 c would receive insolation 84% that of Venus.

HD 73526 c is in a 2:1 orbital resonance with HD 73526 b. Every time planet b goes around its sun twice, planet c goes around once, a similar configuration to planets b and c of the Gliese 876 system.

References

Vela (constellation)
Giant planets
Exoplanets discovered in 2006
Exoplanets detected by radial velocity